Creative Lives is an arts organisation based in the United Kingdom and Ireland. The group was originally founded as Voluntary Arts in 1991 to promote creative cultural activity. In June 2021 the organisation was renamed "Creative Lives". It is supported by funders including the UK Arts Councils and the Irish Arts Council and charitable trusts.

Structure

Creative Lives has offices in Cardiff and Edinburgh, as well as project workers in different locations across the UK and in Dublin. Through a devolved structure across the UK and Ireland, the organisation provides information and training, and works with policy makers, funders and politicians to improve the environment for everyday creativity.

Creative Lives is registered in Scotland as Voluntary Arts Network Company No. 139147 and Charity No. SC 020345.

Activities

Creative Lives promotes creative cultural activities that people undertake for self-improvement, social networking, mental well-being, leisure and fun - but not primarily for payment. The range of art forms includes 'traditional amateur arts and crafts (singing, dancing, drama, quilting, painting, writing etc), to digital arts and creative cookery and gardening - from knitting a jumper to playing the guitar, making a short film to arranging flowers...'. There have been a number of studies and reports exploring the value of participation in the non-professional arts including for the Department for Culture, Media and Sport in 2008  and the Arts and Humanities Research Council.

Projects

 In March 2020, Creative Lives launched #CreativeNetwork - a series of online networking events for those involved in arts, culture and creative industries.
 Creative Lives On Air is a partnership between Creative Lives and BBC Local Radio stations, promoting everyday creativity through local radio. The project began with BBC Radio Merseyside as a legacy project following the Liverpool's year as EU City of Culture in 2008.
 Beginning in Scotland in 2011 and extended across the UK and Ireland the following year, Voluntary Arts organised Voluntary Arts Week, based on similar models in other European countries including the Week of Amateur Arts in Flanders. Taking place for one week in May across the UK and Ireland, the aim of Voluntary Arts Week is to celebrate amateur arts and crafts, and raise interest from the public. The week involves contributions from various amateur art and craft groups, such as open rehearsals, workshops/taster sessions, special performances or exhibitions. The 2013 Voluntary Arts Week featured a national 'CraftBomb', which encouraged participants to take their arts and crafts into the public domain, including in parks, gardens, on railings and outside buildings. In 2017, the ten-day event was renamed Voluntary Arts Festival.
 Voluntary Arts was one of the founding partners in the Get Creative campaign in 2015 as an initial year-long programme. The campaign became an annual spring event in 2016. Get Creative Weekend took place from 7–9 April 2017, with over 650 events across the UK. The chief executive of Creative Lives chairs the steering committee for Get Creative, which also includes representatives from BBC, Arts Council England, Arts Council of Northern Ireland, Arts Council of Wales, Creative Scotland, Crafts Council, Creative People & Places, Fun Palaces and 64 Million Artists. From 2018, the Get Creative Weekend and Voluntary Arts Festival were merged to become the Get Creative Festival.
 The Creative Lives Awards, formerly the Epic Awards, recognise the achievements of voluntary and community-led creativity. The awards have been running in England since 2010, and from 2011 included awards for projects in Ireland, Scotland and Wales. The awards are open to any non-profit amateur arts or crafts groups run by volunteers, based in the UK or Ireland, which took place at least partially in the previous 12 months. One winner and one runner-up are chosen from each of the five nations by a panel of Voluntary Arts staff and board members, and representatives from local arts councils. There is also a ‘People’s Choice Award’, voted for online by members of the public, and the ‘Peer Award’, voted for by the shortlisted nominees. An Award ceremony takes place each year, attended by the main winner from each nation. Previous winners have included a breakdance crew, all-male choir, drumming group and photography project. The Epic Awards winners' reception has previously taken place in London, Derry, Glasgow, Salford, Cardiff and Gateshead.

References

External links
Creative Lives

Charities based in Wales
Charities based in Scotland
Charities based in Northern Ireland
Handicrafts
Arts organisations based in the United Kingdom